Paolo Emilio Landi is an Italian theatrical director, journalist, and documentarian. He has filmed worldwide a number of documentaries for RAI (National Italian Broadcasting Company). He directed plays at several different theatres in the US, in Russian Federation and former Soviet Union.

Theater  
Landi made his professional directing debut with the Italian national premiere of After Magritte (1986), by the English author Tom Stoppard,. with scenery designed by the American painter Jack Frankfurter. His following production, The Bald Soprano by Eugene Ionesco, was performed in Italy, France (Avignon Festival), the USA (Richmond, Virginia), and Russia (Omsk and Saratov).

After the fall of the Berlin Wall he continued his career in former URSS. In 1990 he worked in the previously closed town of Omsk. Omsk Drama Theatre, Russia He was the first director to stage an absurdist play, The Bald Soprano, in a Russian State Academic Theatre of the USSR.

He went on to stage 30 shows in academic and public theaters  in  cities throughout Russia and Eastern Europe, including Moscow, Saint Petersburg, Omsk, Samara,  Saratov, Riga, Vilnius, Chelyabinsk, Kransoyarsk. and Ufa.

In the late nineties Paolo Emilio Landi traveled to the United States for his production of The Servant of Two Masters by Carlo Goldoni at the Milwaukee Repertory Theater. He then began a long association with the University of Richmond (Virginia) where he has been visiting scholar and  instructor of theater and documentary-making. During his  time at the university he specialized in creating  experimental works with students and faculty.

Television 

In 1982 Landi began collaborating with the television program Protestantesimo on Raidue (the State Italian Broadcasting Company) as a director, journalist and host. During his time with the 50-year old program, he produced hundreds of news stories, documentaries, musical programs and studio interviews.

In 2001 he became a member of the Order of Journalists of Lazio. He has directed and produced documentaries in Europe, Africa, Asia, and the Americas.

For Rai WORLD, (The Other Italy), he filmed more than 200 portraits of Italians living in South Africa, mostly in the cities of Johannesburg, Cape Town, and Durban.

In 2015 Landi released a documentary on Nelson Mandela, broadcast on Italy's RAIDUE, as well as France 2, RSI   (the Italian Swiss Broadcasting company) and RTS (the French Swiss broadcasting company)

Landi most recent film work includes three documentaries shot in Washington, DC and New York City, USA.  They are:  L'ultimo giorno (9.11.2001) (The Last Day); So Help Me God (Trump at the White House); 100 giorni di Trump. (Trump's First Hundred Days). He filmed the last interview with late Winnie Madizikela Mandela.

International theatre productions  
USA

 The Servant of Two Masters by Carlo Goldoni, adaptation by  Jeff Hatcher and Paolo Emilio Landi, with Lee Ernst in the title role,  Milwaukee Repertory Theater, Milwaukee, Wisconsin, 1999.
 The Venetian Twins by Carlo Goldoni, University of Richmond, VA, 2002.
 The Chairs and The Bald Soprano by  Eugene Ionesco, University of Richmond, VA, 2006.
 The Servant of Two Masters by Carlo Goldoni, adaptation by Jeff Hatcher and Paolo Emilio Landi, Newark, Delaware REP, 2013.
 Heir Apparent by David Ives, Quill Theater, Richmond, VA.

Russia

  The Bald Soprano by  Eugene Ionesco.  State Omsk Drama Theatre, 1991.
  Venetian Twins by Carlo Goldoni, State Omsk Drama Theatre, 1995.
 Misery and Nobility by  Eduardo Scarpetta, State Omsk Drama Theatre, 1998.
 Venetian Twins by Carlo Goldoni,  Samara Drama National Theatre (Russia), 2000.
 Filumena Marturano by Eduardo De Filippo, Saratov Youth Theatre, 2001.
 Man and Gentleman by Eduardo De Filippo, State Omsk Drama Theatre, 2002.
 Ladies' Night  by J. Collard, Samara Drama National Theatre, 2002.
 Servant  of Two Masters by Carlo Goldoni, adaptation by  Jeff Hatcher and Paolo Emilio Landi, Saratov Youth Theatre, 2003.
 They Shoot Horses, Don't They? from H. Mc Coy, adaptation by Dmitri Lebedev e Paolo E. Landi,  Samara Drama National Theatre (Russia), 2004.
 Venetian Twins by Carlo Goldoni,( Carnevale Edition) - Ufa Drama National Theatre (Bashkhortostan, Russian Federation), 2005.
 Noises Off by  Michael Frayn, Saratov Youth Theatre (Russia), 2006.
 Imaginary Invalid by Molière, State Omsk Drama Theatre, 2008. 
 Chairs  & Bald Soprano  by  Eugene Ionesco, Saratov Youth Theatre (Russia), 2008.
 Misery and Nobility by  Eduardo Scarpetta, State Chelyabinsk Drama Theatre, 2009.
 Miser  by Molière, Ufa Drama National Theatre (Bashkhortostan, Russian Federation), 2009.
 Love of the Three Oranges by Carlo Gozzi, Saratov Youth Theatre (Russia), 2010
 Naples Town of Millionaires by Eduardo de Filippo, Ufa Drama National Theatre (Bashkhortostan, Russian Federation), 2011.
 Venetian Twins by Carlo Goldoni, Teatro Na Taganka, Moscow (Russia) 2011.
 Bullets over Broadway from Woody Allen's movie, Samara Drama National Theatre, 2013
 Pinocchio adaptation from Carlo Collodi's novel, Saratov Youth Theatre (Russia), 2014.
 Man and Gentleman by Eduardo De Filippo, Samara Drama National Theatre, 2015
 Misery and Nobility by  Eduardo Scarpetta, 2015.
 The Fool's doctor by  Eduardo Scarpetta, Ufa Drama National Theatre (Bashkhortostan, Russian Federation), 2018.
 Neapolitan Holiday by Eduardo Scarpetta, Yaroslav Academic Theatre, Volkov, Yaroslav, Russian Federation, 2019.

Lithuania
 SMS, All about man ( Strip man show aka Viskas Apie Vyrus) by Paolo E. Landi, Jaunimo Teatras, Vilnius, 2004, in Lithuanian.
 Triukšmas Už Kulisų - Noises Off by Michael Frayn, Jaunimo Teatras, Vilnius, 2007, in Lithuanian.
 Vargsai. Aristokratai by  Eduardo Scarpetta, Jaunimo Teatras, Vilnius, 2007, in Lithuanian.
Latvia
 The Man, the Best, the Virtue by Luigi Pirandello, Riga Russian National Drama Theatre, 1993.
 Misery and Nobility  by  Eduardo Scarpetta, Riga Russian National Drama Theatre, 2008.
 Man and Gentleman by Eduardo De Filippo, Riga Russian National Drama Theatre, 2011.
 Filumena Marturano by Eduardo De Filippo, 2013.
France
 La Cantatrice Chauve by Eugene Ionesco, Festival d'Avignon, 1995.
Germany 
 Tragedies in two lines, by Achille Campanile, 1992.

Books 

Giorgio Bouchard, Paolo Emilio Landi, Bibbia e libertà - Otto secoli di storia valdese,  Claudiana, Torino, 2006
Carlo Goldoni translated and adapted by Jeffrey Hatcher and Paolo Emilio Landi, Dramatist Play service INC, 2000
Paolo Emilio Landi, In Nome di Dio - Guerra di religione nelle Isole Molucche, Sinnos, Roma, 2000

References

Living people
Italian theatre directors
Italian male journalists
Year of birth missing (living people)